WLPX-TV (channel 29) is a television station licensed to Charleston, West Virginia, United States, broadcasting the Ion Television network to the Charleston–Huntington market. The station is owned and operated by the Ion Media subsidiary of the E. W. Scripps Company, and has offices on Prestige Park Drive in Hurricane; its transmitter is located near Milton, West Virginia.

History
After originating as a construction permit in 1987 and receiving several extensions, WLPX-TV applied for its license on September 11, 1998. In the construction phase and for its first month on air, the station's calls were WKRP (the same as the fictional radio station in Cincinnati); it adopted its current call sign on October 5 of the same year. It has been a member of Ion (previously known as Pax TV and i: Independent Television) since its inception.

Technical information

Subchannels
The station's digital signal is multiplexed:

Analog-to-digital conversion
WLPX-TV discontinued regular programming on its analog signal, over UHF channel 29, on June 12, 2009, the official date in which full-power television stations in the United States transitioned from analog to digital broadcasts under federal mandate. The station's digital signal remained on its pre-transition UHF channel 39. Through the use of PSIP, digital television receivers display the station's virtual channel as its former UHF analog channel 29.

References

External links

Television channels and stations established in 1998
1998 establishments in West Virginia
Ion Television affiliates
Court TV affiliates
Bounce TV affiliates
Grit (TV network) affiliates
Defy TV affiliates
TrueReal affiliates
Scripps News affiliates
E. W. Scripps Company television stations
LPX-TV